Year 139 (CXXXIX) was a common year starting on Wednesday (link will display the full calendar) of the Julian calendar. At the time, in Western civilization, it was known as the Year of the Consulship of Hadrianus and Praesens (or, less frequently, year 892 Ab urbe condita). The denomination 139 for this year has been used since the early medieval period, when the Anno Domini calendar era became the prevalent method in Europe for naming years.

Events 
 By place 

 Roman Empire 
 The Tomb of Hadrian in Rome is completed; Emperor Antoninus Pius cremates the body of Hadrian, and places his ashes, together with that of his wife Vibia Sabina and his adopted son, Lucius Aelius, in the mausoleum.
 Marcus Aurelius is named Caesar. He marries the 9-year-old Faustina the Younger, daughter of Antoninus Pius.
 Antoninus Pius and Gaius Bruttius Praesens become Roman Consuls.

Armenia 
139 Mcurn earthquake, listed in bibliographical records of seismology as having affected the city of Mcurn (modern Hösnek, Turkey). The earthquake reportedly took place in the vicinity of Mount Ararat. The region was part of the historic Kingdom of Armenia, corresponding to eastern areas of modern Turkey. A primary source for the earthquake is the work of the historian Movses Khorenatsi (5th century).

Births

Deaths 
 Zhang Heng, Chinese astronomer and statesman (b. AD 78)

References

Sources